Straight Ahead is an album by American jazz saxophonist Eddie "Lockjaw" Davis with the Tommy Flanagan Trio recorded in 1976 and released on the Pablo label.

Critical reception 

Allmusic stated "A perfect example of Eddie "Lockjaw" Davis' playing, this superior quartet set features the tough-toned tenor swinging hard on standards, showing his warmth on ballads, and coming up with inventive ideas within the swing/bop tradition".

Track listing 
 "Lover" (Richard Rodgers, Lorenz Hart) – 4:41
 "Wave" (Antônio Carlos Jobim) – 5:20
 "On a Clear Day (You Can See Forever)" (Burton Lane, Alan Jay Lerner) – 4:05
 "The Chef" (Eddie "Lockjaw" Davis) – 3:52
 "Gigi" (Frederick Loewe, Lerner) – 4:22
 "Last Train from Overbrook" (James Moody) – 6:19
 "The Good Life" (Sacha Distel, Jack Reardon) – 5:08
 "I'll Never Be the Same" (Matty Malneck, Frank Signorelli, Gus Kahn) – 5:13
 "Watch What Happens" (Michel Legrand) – 5:59

Personnel 
 Eddie "Lockjaw" Davis – tenor saxophone
 Tommy Flanagan – piano
 Keter Betts – bass
 Bobby Durham – drums

References 

Eddie "Lockjaw" Davis albums
Tommy Flanagan albums
1976 albums
Pablo Records albums
Albums produced by Norman Granz